Ru Freeman is a Sri Lankan born writer and activist whose creative and political work has appeared internationally, including in the UK Guardian, The Boston Globe, and the New York Times. She is the author of the novels A Disobedient Girl (Atria/Simon & Schuster, 2009), and On Sal Mal Lane (Graywolf Press), a NYT Editor’s Choice Book. Both novels have been translated into multiple languages including Italian, French, Turkish, Dutch, and Chinese. She is editor of the anthology, Extraordinary Rendition: (American) Writers on Palestine (OR Books, 2015 and Interlink, 2016), a collection of the voices of 65 American poets and writers speaking about America’s dis/engagement with Palestine, and co-editor of the anthology, Indivisible: Global Leaders on Shared Security (Interlink, 2019). She holds a graduate degree in labor studies, researching female migrant labor in the countries of Kuwait, the U.A.E, and the Kingdom of Saudi Arabia, and has worked at the Institute for Policy Studies in Washington, DC, in the South Asia office of the American Federation of Labor-Congress of Industrial Organizations (AFL/CIO), and the American Friends Service Committee in their humanitarian and disaster relief programs. She is a contributing editorial board member of the Asian American Literary Review, and a fellow of the Bread Loaf Writer’s Conference, Yaddo, Hedgebrook, the Virginia Center for the Creative Arts and the Lannan Foundation. She is the 2014 winner of the Janet Heidinger Kafka Prize for Fiction by an American Woman. She writes for the Huffington Post on books and politics.

Life
Ru Freeman was born in Colombo.
She studied at Murdoch University and graduated from Bates College with a BA, and from the University of Colombo.

Her work has appeared in Huffington Post, Guernica, Story Quarterly, VQR, Crab Orchard Review, Narrative, World Literature Today, Post Road, Confessions: Fact or Fiction?.

She teaches at Columbia University.

Works

References

External links

https://www.pen.org/ru-freeman
http://www.artsatl.com/2013/10/qa-ru-freeman/
http://internationalfestivalofauthors.wordpress.com/tag/ru-freeman/

Living people
Sri Lankan novelists
1967 births